Tonic is a 2021 Indian Bengali language family drama film directed by Avijit Sen in his directorial debut, produced by Atanu Raychaudhuri and distributed by Bengal Talkies. The film revolves around an elderly couple, portrayed by Paran Bandopadhyay and Shakuntala Barua, who get to enjoy a fresh lease of life through their tourist guide Tonic (Dev).

Tonic marked the directorial debut of Avijit Sen, who had previously worked as an assistant director to Rajkumar Hirani. Besides directing, he wrote the story, which he completed by a year, taking cues from his own life. The film's cinematography was handled by Supriyo Dutta, while Sujay Datta Ray edited it. It was jointly distributed by Bengal Talkies and Dev Entertainment Ventures.

Upon its premiere on 2 December 2021, Tonic opened to a positive critical reception and became a huge commercial success, eventually becoming the highest-grossing Bengali film of 2021. The chemistry between Dev and Paran Bandopadhyay won appraisals, besides the other elements. At the 5th Filmfare Awards Bangla, the film received a leading six nominations and won three, including Best Film, Best Actor (Bandopadhyay) and Best Debut Director (Sen).

Plot
Tonic tells us the story of 75-year-old retired Jaladhar Sen who lives with his wife, son, daughter-in-law and granddaughter. Their relationship is hampered due to authoritative attitude and over-possessiveness of son. The story spins around the old couple's trouble due to the family's behavior and intensifies, when son and daughter-in-law celebrate their marriage anniversary in a grand way but their 46th marriage anniversary celebration is planned to be just a small get-together. The old plans for a foreign trip and thus comes to a travel agent named Tonic who later turns out to be a miracle maker in life. The foreign trip was cancelled as the passport of Jaladhar's wife got rejected due to the non-availability of some important documents. Jaladhar often rebuked Tonic as all his dreams were shattered. But, later the old couple planned for a visit to Darjeeling without telling their son where Tonic still accompanies them. Jaladhar and his wife experience true fun and bliss. Jaladhar rock-climbing, paragliding, rafting and other activities, which he enjoys. Later, Tonic celebrates Jaladhar’s anniversary in a grand way, and reveals to Jaladhar’s wife that his parents died when he was living abroad. So he decided to help those old couples who want to experience life to the fullest but are unable to. Jaladhar suddenly becomes sick and needs to be taken to the hospital. His son arrives soon and threatens to report Tonic to the police. But he changes his mind on hearing how Tonic gave his parents new life. They all happily decide to go to Paris at the end of the film. The blissful presence of Tonic returns the lost happiness and love in the Sen family. Jaladhar was grateful to Tonic as it was because of him that he learned what it means to live the life to its fullest.

Cast

Soundtrack 

The soundtrack is composed by Jeet Gannguli and lyrics by Prosen, Srijato and Anindya Chatterjee.

Awards

It has been the official selection for Indian Panorama (Mainstream Cinema Section) in 53rd International Film Festival of India in Goa.

References

External links
 

Bengali-language Indian films
2020s Bengali-language films
Indian drama films
Films produced by Dev (Bengali actor)
Films scored by Jeet Ganguly
2021 drama films